Phaulomyrma is a genus of ants in the subfamily Leptanillinae containing a single species, Phaulomyrma javana.

The genus was first described in 1930 with Phaulomyrma javana as the type species, based on two males from Bogor on the island of Java. Leptanilla tanit from Tunisia was originally included in the genus by Wheeler & Wheeler (1930), but was transferred back to Leptanilla by Petersen (1968), making the genus monotypic.

References

Leptanillinae
Monotypic ant genera
Hymenoptera of Asia